"Greenleaf" is a short story by Flannery O'Connor published in 1956 in The Kenyon Review, and later appeared in her short story collection Everything That Rises Must Converge that was published in 1965 after her death in August 1964. The work garnered the author's first O. Henry Award first prize in 1957.

Plot summary 
Mrs. May owns a farm on which she hires Mr. Greenleaf to work because her sons are not interested in farm work. To her dismay, both live at home and are unmarried. One sells insurance to African Americans while the other is a scholar and teacher at a university. Both Mrs. May and Mr. Greenleaf's wife, Mrs. Greenleaf, consider themselves Christians. Mrs. May, however, has a somewhat smug morality based upon outward success, while Mrs. Greenleaf secretly practices faith healing and recognizes herself as a sinner. When no one is nearby, Mrs. Greenleaf prays aloud that Jesus "stab her in the heart," implying that she must change her sinful heart. The Greenleafs' twin sons are decorated World War II veterans who both own farms. Considered successful, they are married to French women whom they met during the war, and they each have three children.

When a bull belonging to Mr. Greenleaf's boys escapes onto Mrs. May's property, she orders Mr. Greenleaf to shoot it. She drives Mr. Greenleaf to a pasture to shoot the bull, and while Mr. Greenleaf is chasing it, the bull escapes into the woods. After becoming impatient, Mrs. May honks the car horn, and the bull runs out of the woods, goring her in the heart just as Mr. Greenleaf reappears.

Some writers suggest that the bull symbolizes Christ.

References

Short stories by Flannery O'Connor
1956 short stories